Russell Malone (born November 8, 1963) is an American jazz guitarist. He began working with Jimmy Smith in 1988 and went on to work with Harry Connick, Jr. and Diana Krall throughout the 1990s.

Biography
Malone was born in Albany, Georgia, United States. He began playing at the age of four with a toy guitar his mother bought him. He was influenced by B.B. King and The Dixie Hummingbirds. A significant experience was when he was twelve and saw George Benson perform on television with Benny Goodman. He is mostly self-taught.

Starting in 1988, he spent two years with Jimmy Smith, then three with Harry Connick Jr. In 1995, he became the guitarist for the Diana Krall Trio, participating in three Grammy-nominated albums, including When I Look in Your Eyes, which won the award for Best Vocal Jazz Performance. Malone was part of pianist Benny Green's recordings in the late 1990s and 2000: Kaleidoscope (1997), These Are Soulful Days (1999), and Naturally (2000). The two formed a duo and released the live album Jazz at The Bistro in 2003 and the studio album Bluebird in 2004. They toured until 2007.

Malone has toured with Ron Carter, Roy Hargrove, and Dianne Reeves and has done session work with Kenny Barron, Branford Marsalis, Wynton Marsalis, Jack McDuff, Mulgrew Miller, and Eddie "Cleanhead" Vinson. He recorded his first solo album in 1992 and has led his own trio and quartet. Other guest appearances have included Malone with vibraphonist Bobby Hutcherson, organist Dr. Lonnie Smith, and pianist Hank Jones in celebration of his 90th birthday. In October 2008 he performed in a duo with guitarist Bill Frisell at Yoshi's in Oakland, California. During the next year, Malone became a member of the band for saxophonist Sonny Rollins, celebrating his 80th birthday in New York City.

Malone recorded live on September 9–11, 2005, at Jazz Standard, New York City, and Maxjazz documented the performances on the albums Live at Jazz Standard, Volume One (2006) and Live at Jazz Standard, Volume Two (2007). Appearing on these two volumes, and touring as The Russell Malone Quartet, were Martin Bejerano on piano, Tassili Bond on bass, and Johnathan Blake on drums. Malone's 2010 recording Triple Play (also on Maxjazz) featured David Wong on bass and Montez Coleman on drums.  His album, All About Melody featured  pianist Rick Germanson, bassist Luke Sellick, and drummer Willie Jones III.

Discography

As leader
 Russell Malone (Columbia, 1992)
 Black Butterfly (Columbia, 1993)
 Sweet Georgia Peach (Impulse!, 1998)
 Look Who's Here (Verve, 2000)
 Heartstrings (Verve, 2001)
 Ray Brown Monty Alexander Russell Malone (Telarc, 2002)
 Jazz at the Bistro with Benny Green (Telarc, 2003)
 Playground (Maxjazz, 2004)
 Bluebird with Benny Green (Telarc, 2004)
 Live at Jazz Standard Vol. One (Maxjazz, 2006)
 Live at Jazz Standard Vol. Two (Maxjazz, 2007)
 Triple Play (Maxjazz, 2010)
 Love Looks Good on You (HighNote, 2015)
 All About Melody (HighNote, 2016)
 Time for the Dancers (HighNote, 2017)

As guest
With Ray Brown
 Some of My Best Friends Are...Singers (Telarc, 1998)
 Christmas Songs with the Ray Brown Trio (Telarc, 1999)
 Some of My Best Friends Are...Guitarists (Telarc, 2002)

With Harry Connick Jr.
 We Are in Love (Columbia, 1990)
 Blue Light Red Light (Sony, 1991)
 When My Heart Finds Christmas (Columbia, 1993)

With Benny Green
 Kaleidoscope (Blue Note, 1997)
 These Are Soulful Days (Blue Note, 1999)
 Naturally (Telarc, 2000)

With Diana Krall
 All for You: A Dedication to the Nat King Cole Trio (Justin Time, 1996)
 Love Scenes (Impulse!, 1997)
 Have Yourself a Merry Little Christmas (Impulse!, 1998)
 Diana Krall (Verve, 1999)
 When I Look in Your Eyes (Verve, 1999)
 The Look of Love (Verve, 2001)
 Christmas Songs (Verve, 2005)
 Turn Up the Quiet (Verve, 2017)
 This Dream of You (Verve, 2020)

With Houston Person
 Soft Lights (HighNote, 1999)
 Sentimental Journey (HighNote, 2002)
 The Art and Soul of Houston Person (HighNote, 2008)

With David Sanborn
 Timeagain (Verve, 2003)
 Closer (Verve, 2005)
 Here & Gone (Decca, 2008)

With others
 Mose Allison, Gimcracks and Gewgaws (Blue Note, 1998)
 Kenny Barron, Spirit Song (Verve, 2000)
 Gary Bartz, The Blues Chronicles (Atlantic, 1996)
 Stefano di Battista, Trouble Shootin'  (Blue Note, 2007)
 David Benoit, Here's to You Charlie Brown (GRP, 2000)
 Don Braden, Organic (Epicure, 1995)
 Gary Burton, For Hamp, Red, Bags, and Cal (Concord Jazz, 2001)
 Regina Carter, Motor City Moments (Verve, 2000)
 Ron Carter, The Golden Striker (Blue Note, 2003)
 Cyrus Chestnut, Genuine Chestnut (Telarc, 2006)
 The Chieftains, Tears of Stone (RCA Victor, 1999)
 Jimmy Cobb, Jazz in the Key of Blue (Chesky, 2009)
 Natalie Cole, Ask A Woman Who Knows (Verve, 2002)
 Will Downing, Sensual Journey (Verve, 2002)
 Jon Faddis, Teranga (Koch, 2006)
 Macy Gray, Stripped (Chesky, 2016)
 Dave Grusin, Two for the Road (GRP, 1997)
 Roy Hargrove, Habana (Verve, 1997)
 Vincent Herring, Hard Times (Smoke Sessions, 2017)
 Shirley Horn, You're My Thrill (Verve, 2001)
 Freddie Hubbard, On the Real Side (Four Quarters, 2008)
 Etta Jones, All the Way (HighNote, 1999)
 B. B. King, Let the Good Times Roll (MCA, 1999)
 Gladys Knight, Before Me (Verve, 2006)
 Jeff Lorber, He Had a Hat (Blue Note, 2007)
 Branford Marsalis, I Heard You Twice the First Time (Columbia, 1992)
 Christian McBride, A Family Affair (Verve, 1998)
 Bill Mobley, Hittin' Home (Space Time, 2016)
 New York Voices, New York Voices Sing the Songs of Paul Simon (RCA Victor, 1998)
 Johnny O'Neal, On the Montreal Scene (Justin Time, 1996)
 Kenny Rankin, A Song for You (Verve, 2002)
 Tony Reedus, People Get Ready (Sweet Basil, 1998)
 Dianne Reeves, The Calling (Blue Note, 2001)
 Dianne Reeves, When You Know (Blue Note, 2008)
 Sonny Rollins, Road Shows, Vol. 2 (EmArcy, 2011)
 Stephen Scott, The Beautiful Thing (Jazz Heritage, 1997)
 Janis Siegel, The Tender Trap (Monarch, 1999)
 Janis Siegel, Friday Night Special (Telarc, 2003)
 Terell Stafford, Centripetal Force (Candid, 1997)
 Joss Stone, Colour Me Free! (Virgin, 2009)
 Jimmy Smith, Dot Com Blues (Blue Thumb, 2000)
 Billy Taylor, Taylor Made at the Kennedy Center (Kennedy Center Jazz 2005)
 Steve Turre, Delicious and Delightful (HighNote, 2010)
 Steve Turre, Kenny Barron, The Very Thought of You (Smoke Sessions, 2018)
 Gerald Wilson, In My Time (Mack Avenue, 2005)

References

1963 births
Swing guitarists
Bebop guitarists
Musicians from Albany, Georgia
Living people
American jazz guitarists
Guitarists from Georgia (U.S. state)
Impulse! Records artists
Verve Records artists
20th-century American guitarists
African-American jazz guitarists
HighNote Records artists
20th-century African-American musicians
21st-century African-American people